José Alfredo Rodríguez (born September 26, 1989) is a Mexican professional boxer who held the WBA light flyweight interim title from 2011 to 2012. He challenged for the WBA world title in 2012 and also the IBF super flyweight title in 2017.

Professional career
In August 2010, José beat undefeated Karluis Díaz for the vacant WBC Youth Intercontinental Light Flyweight title.

WBA Light Flyweight Championship
On November 19, 2011 Rodríguez upset Nethra Sasiprapa to win the interim WBA Light Flyweight Championship.

Professional boxing record

See also
List of Mexican boxing world champions
List of light-flyweight boxing champions
List of WBA world champions

References

External links

Boxers from Sinaloa
Sportspeople from Mazatlán
World boxing champions
World Boxing Association champions
World light-flyweight boxing champions
Light-flyweight boxers
1989 births
Living people
Mexican male boxers